Ghar Ghar Ki Kahani may refer to:
 Ghar Ghar Ki Kahani (1970 film), a Hindi-language drama film
 Ghar Ghar Ki Kahani (1988 film), a Bollywood drama film